Pyar Ki Rahen is a 1959 Indian film starring Pradeep Kumar and Anita Guha. Pyar Ki Rahen is an emotional romantic family tragedy drama film crafted with excellence by Lekhraj Bhakri. Primary star cast Pradeep Kumar, Anita Guha, Kuldip Kaur.

Soundtrack
"Do Roz Mein woh Pyar Ka Aalam Ujad Gaya" - Mukesh
"Tum Se Door Chale, Hum Mazbur Chale" - Hemant Kumar, Lata Mangeshkar
"Dekho Ji Akeli Aaya Jaaya Na Karo, Yun Banke Sawaar Ke Tadpaaya Na Karo" - Geeta Dutt, Mohammed Rafi
"Gharwale Ghar Nahin, Humen Kisi Ka Dar Nahin" - Geeta Dutt, Mohammed Rafi
"Gori Gori Baahen Tikhi Tikhi Hai Yeh Nigahen" - Asha Bhosle
"Hum Bhi Is Duniya Mein Kya Taqdeer Lekar Aaye Hai" - Asha Bhosle

References

External links
 

1959 films
1950s Hindi-language films